Florence Hinkle (June 22, 1885 - April 19, 1933) was an operatic soprano.

Biography
She was born on June 22, 1885 in Columbia, Pennsylvania. 
She toured with the Metropolitan Opera Company, and in 1915, appeared in Richmond, Virginia. In 1919, she appeared at Aeolian Hall (Manhattan).
She died on April 19, 1933 in Cincinnati, Ohio.

Family
On June 20, 1916 in Manhattan she married Herbert Witherspoon, he had been previously married. 
Her widower died in 1935 after being named as the general manager of the Metropolitan Opera to replace Giulio Gatti-Casazza. His will set aside money for the Library of Congress to buy musical manuscripts in her name.

References

External links

Florence Hinkle at the National Jukebox

"Florence Hinkle", Chronicling America

1885 births
1933 deaths
People from Manhattan
American operatic sopranos
20th-century American women  opera singers
People from Columbia, Pennsylvania
Singers from New York City
Singers from Pennsylvania
Classical musicians from New York (state)
Classical musicians from Pennsylvania